Festival Park may refer to:

 Festival Park in the English city of Stoke-on-Trent, former site of a National Garden Festival.
 Festival Park, Ebbw Vale, in Wales, an outdoor shopping centre on the former site of a National Garden Festival.
 The Henry Maier Festival Park in the U.S. city of Milwaukee, along the shores of Lake Michigan.
 Roanoke Island Festival Park
 Jamestown Festival Park
 Festival Park, Lake George, in Hobart, Indiana.
 Festival Park, Zephyrhills
 Festival Park Iowa, a themed event park in Des Moines, Iowa.